The First Deakin ministry (Protectionist) was the 2nd ministry of the Government of Australia. It was led by the country's 2nd Prime Minister, Alfred Deakin. The First Deakin ministry succeeded the Barton ministry, which dissolved on 24 September 1903 following Sir Edmund Barton's retirement from Parliament to enter the inaugural High Court. The ministry was replaced by the Watson ministry on 27 April 1904 after the Labour Party withdrew their support over the Conciliation and Arbitration Bill.

James Drake, who died in 1941, was the last surviving member of the First Deakin ministry; Drake was also the last surviving minister of the Barton government and the Reid government.

Ministry

References

Ministries of Edward VII
Australian Commonwealth ministries
1903 establishments in Australia
1904 disestablishments in Australia
Cabinets established in 1903
Cabinets disestablished in 1904